Ceriagrion moorei is a species of damselfly in the family Coenagrionidae. It is found in Kenya and Uganda. Its natural habitats are dry savanna, moist savanna, subtropical or tropical dry shrubland, subtropical or tropical moist shrubland, rivers, freshwater marshes, and intermittent freshwater marshes.

References
 Clausnitzer, V. 2005.  Ceriagrion moorei.   2006 IUCN Red List of Threatened Species.   Downloaded on 9 August 2007.

Coenagrionidae
Insects described in 1952
Taxonomy articles created by Polbot